Velitscha Mintscheva is a Bulgarian sprint canoer who competed in the late 1970s. She won a gold medal in the K-4 500 m event at the 1977 ICF Canoe Sprint World Championships in Sofia.

References

Bulgarian female canoeists
Living people
Year of birth missing (living people)
ICF Canoe Sprint World Championships medalists in kayak